is a passenger railway station operated by the Takamatsu-Kotohira Electric Railroad in Takamatsu, Kagawa, Japan.  It is operated by the private transportation company Takamatsu-Kotohira Electric Railroad (Kotoden) and is designated station "N08".

Lines
Nishi-Maeda Station is a station on the Kotoden Nagao Line and is located 7.2 km from the terminus of the line at Kawaramachi Station and 8.9 kilometers from Takamatsu-Chikkō Station.

Layout
The station consists of one side platform serving a single track. The station is unattended.

Adjacent stations

History
Nishi-Maeda Station opened on April 30, 1912, as a station on the Takamatsu Electric Tramway. It was located near the east end of the Yoshida River near Kawaramachi from the current location. On November 1, 1943, it became a station on the Takamatsu Kotohira Electric Railway Nagao Line. On June 21, 1963, it was moved to the current location.

Surrounding area
Takamatsu City Maeda Elementary School
Maeda Cultural Center
Nakagawa Rimbo Children's Center

Passenger statistics

See also
 List of railway stations in Japan

References

External links

  

Railway stations in Japan opened in 1912
Railway stations in Takamatsu